Pedro Francisco da Costa Alvarenga (1826 – 14 July 1883) was a Brazilian-born Portuguese physician. He was a founder and main editor of the Gazeta Médica de Lisboa.

He became notable for his clinical work during the cholera morbus and yellow fever epidemics in Lisbon in 1856 and 1857, respectively. Alvarenga also introduced the sphygmograph, the first non-intrusive device used to estimate blood pressure, to Portugal.

Alvarenga discovered the double crural murmur, a sign of aortic insufficiency (published in 1855, translated to French in 1856), almost a decade before Duroziez.

Distinctions

National orders
 Knight of the Order of the Tower and Sword
 Commander of the Order of Christ
 Officer of the Order of Saint James of the Sword

Foreign orders
 Commander of the Order of Leopold (Belgium)
 Commander of the Order of Charles III (Spain)
 Grand Cross of the Order of Isabella the Catholic (Spain)

Alvarenga Prize 
The Alvarenga Prize, named after Alvarenga, is awarded by the Swedish Medical Society.

References

1826 births
1883 deaths
19th-century Brazilian physicians
Commanders of the Order of Christ (Portugal)
Officers of the Order of Saint James of the Sword
19th-century Portuguese physicians